Callistoctopus macropus, also known as the Atlantic white-spotted octopus, white-spotted octopus, grass octopus or grass scuttle, is a species of octopus found in shallow areas of the Mediterranean Sea, the warmer parts of the eastern and western Atlantic Ocean, the Caribbean Sea, and the Indo-Pacific region. This octopus feeds on small organisms which lurk among the branches of corals.

Description
The first pair of arms are a metre or so long, and are much longer than the remaining three pairs. The arms are all connected by a shallow web. This octopus is red, with white blotches on its body, and paired white spots on its arms. When it is disturbed, its colour becomes more intense, deimatic behaviour which may make it appear threatening to a potential predator.

Distribution and habitat
Populations of Callistoctopus macropus form a species complex found in the Mediterranean Sea, the temperate and tropical Atlantic Ocean and the Caribbean Sea. It is also present in the Pacific and Indian Oceans. Its favoured habitat is sand, rubble or seagrass meadows, and it sometimes buries itself under the sand.

Ecology

Callistoctopus macropus is more fastidious in its diet than is the common octopus (Octopus vulgaris), a species with which it shares some of its range and which feeds by day. Callistoctopus macropus, by contrast, feeds by night. Its method of feeding is to move from one clump of branching coral to another, often Acropora or Stylophora spp.. The octopus wraps its mantle around a coral head and probes with its arms among the branches, searching for the small fish and invertebrates that seek protection there. It has been found that a number of groupers (family Serranidae) and other predatory fish associate with the octopus when it is feeding, pouncing on small organisms that are flushed from the coral head by the octopus.

For many years, the breeding habits of this octopus were not known. The female then brooded the eggs, caring for them by aerating them and keeping them clean. The female octopus stopped feeding at the time the eggs were laid and died soon after they had hatched, as is common among octopus species. They fed on zooplankton such as crustacean larvae.

References

 Norman M.D. & Hochberg F.G. (2005) The current state of Octopus taxonomy. Phuket Marine Biological Center Research Bulletin 66:127–154

External links
 

Octopodidae
Molluscs of the Atlantic Ocean
Molluscs of the Indian Ocean
Molluscs of the Mediterranean Sea
Molluscs of the Pacific Ocean
Fauna of the Caribbean
Marine molluscs of Africa
Marine molluscs of Europe
Marine molluscs of North America
Cephalopods of Europe
Cephalopods described in 1826
Taxa named by Antoine Risso